The 1980–81 European Cup was the 26th season of the European Cup football club tournament, and was won for a third time by Liverpool, who beat six-time champions Real Madrid in the final. In the 11 seasons up to and including this one, there were only four winners of the European Cup (Ajax, Bayern Munich, Nottingham Forest and Liverpool), but there were eleven different runners-up. This sequence was ended the following year, when Bayern Munich lost to first-time finalists Aston Villa.

Nottingham Forest, the defending champions, were eliminated by CSKA Sofia in the first round.

Preliminary round

|}

First leg

Second leg

Budapest Honvéd won 11–0 on aggregate.

First round

|}

First leg

Second leg

Aberdeen won 1–0 on aggregate.

Liverpool won 11–2 on aggregate.

CSKA Sofia won 2–0 on aggregate.

Szombierki Bytom won 4–2 on aggregate.

Bayern Munich won 7–2 on aggregate.

Ajax won 3–0 on aggregate.

Baník Ostrava won 2–1 on aggregate.

BFC Dynamo won 4–2 on aggregate.

Spartak Moscow won 9–0 on aggregate.

Esbjerg won 3–2 on aggregate.

Real Madrid won 7–2 on aggregate.

Budapest Honvéd won 3–0 on aggregate.

Nantes won 3–0 on aggregate.

Internazionale won 3–1 on aggregate.

Basel won 5–1 on aggregate.

Red Star Belgrade won 7–3 on aggregate.

Second round

|}

First leg

Second leg

Liverpool won 5–0 on aggregate.

CSKA Sofia won 5–0 on aggregate.

Bayern Munich won 6–3 on aggregate.

1–1 on aggregate; Baník Ostrava won on away goals.

Spartak Moscow won 3–2 on aggregate.

Real Madrid won 3–0 on aggregate.

Internazionale won 3–2 on aggregate.

Red Star Belgrade won 2–1 on aggregate.

Quarter-finals

|}

First leg

Second leg

Liverpool won 6–1 on aggregate.

Bayern Munich won 6–2 on aggregate.

Real Madrid won 2–0 on aggregate.

Internazionale won 2–1 on aggregate.

Semi-finals

|}

First leg

Second leg

1–1 on aggregate; Liverpool won on away goals.

Real Madrid won 2–1 on aggregate.

Final

Top scorers
The top scorers from the 1980–81 European Cup (excluding preliminary round) are as follows:

See also
1981 Intercontinental Cup

External links
1980–81 All matches – season at UEFA website
 European Cup results at Rec.Sport.Soccer Statistics Foundation
 All scorers 1980–81 European Cup (excluding preliminary round) according to protocols UEFA
1980-81 European Cup – results and line-ups (archive)

1980–81 in European football
European Champion Clubs' Cup seasons